Robert McNeal (19 January 1891 – 15 May 1956) was an English footballer who played as a left-half. Despite his career running through World War I he managed nearly 400 appearances in the Football League for West Bromwich Albion, playing in some of the most successful seasons in the club's history. He won the Second Division (1910–11), First Division (1919–20), and Charity Shield (1920), and played in the 1912 FA Cup Final.

Early and personal life
Robert McNeal was born on 19 January 1891 in Hobson, near Stanley, County Durham. He was the eldest of three children to John and Hannah (née Bell); his father was a coal miner. He married Emily Elizabeth Howell in 1913 and has two daughters: Rita Marion and Jeanne. After leaving the game he became a licensee in West Bromwich.

Club career
McNeal played football for the village team before he turned professional with West Bromwich Albion in June 1910. In his first full season he helped the club to the Second Division title. The "Throstles" then finished ninth in the First Division in 1911–12. He also won a runners-up medal in the 1912 FA Cup Final when Albion lost 1–0 to Barnsley in a replay at Bramall Lane. Albion went on to post top ten finishes in the league in 1912–13, 1913–14, and 1914–15, before the Football League was suspended due to World War I.

During the war he appeared as a guest player for Fulham, Middlesbrough, Notts County and Port Vale. McNeal was part of West Bromwich Albion's league championship-winning side of 1919–20. The team also won the 1920 Charity Shield with a 2–0 victory over Tottenham Hotspur at White Hart Lane. Albion then dropped to 14th and 13th-place finishes in 1920–21 and 1921–22. They finished seventh in 1922–23 and 16th in 1923–24, before posting a second-place finish in 1924–25 – they ended the campaign just two points behind champions Huddersfield Town. In May 1925, McNeal retired through injury and became a licensee of a pub in the West Bromwich area. From 1926 to 1927, McNeal served as Albion's coach on a part-time basis.

International career
McNeal earned two England caps during the 1914 British Home Championship, playing the two final England internationals before the onset of World War I, which caused the suspension of the competition until 1920. He was one of four England players to win their first cap on 16 March 1914 as Wales were defeated 2–0 at Ninian Park. His second and final cap came on 14 April as Scotland ran out 3–1 winners at Hampden Park. Overall the competition was something of a minor embarrassment for the country, as the Irish finished as champions and England finished third behind the Scots and just one point ahead of the Welsh.

Career statistics
Source:

Honours
West Bromwich Albion
Football League Second Division: 1910–11
FA Cup runner-up: 1912
Football League First Division: 1919–20
FA Charity Shield: 1920

References

1891 births
1956 deaths
Footballers from County Durham
English footballers
England international footballers
Association football midfielders
West Bromwich Albion F.C. players
Fulham F.C. wartime guest players
Middlesbrough F.C. wartime guest players
Notts County F.C. wartime guest players
Port Vale F.C. wartime guest players
English Football League players
Association football coaches
West Bromwich Albion F.C. non-playing staff
English Football League representative players
FA Cup Final players